During the 2008–09 English football season, Tranmere Rovers F.C. competed in Football League One.

Season summary 
In the 2007-08 season, Tranmere finished 11th and their ambition for 2008-09 was the play-offs. Their form in the first half of the season was mixed, but they found themselves in 8th place at Christmas. Tranmere finished 7th, missing out on the play-offs by one point. Despite this 7th-placed finish, manager Ronnie Moore was sacked and replaced by John Barnes in mid-June. A run of 5 games unbeaten in March/April led rovers into the play-off positions with 3 games remaining, but 7th placed Scunthorpe were two points behind and had played two games less. Tranmere lost to fellow play-off contenders Leeds United, but Scunthorpe lost too, leaving Rovers in 6th place. They failed to win their final 2 games, meaning they finished 7th.

Kit 
Tranmere's kits were manufactured by Vandanel and sponsored by the Wirral Metropolitan Council.

Squad 
Squad at end of season

Left club during season

Competitions

League One

League table

Results summary

Results by round

Matches

FA Cup

League Cup

Football League Trophy

References

Tranmere Rovers F.C. seasons
Tranmere Rovers